Hrstka (feminine Hrstková) is a Czech surname. Notable people with the surname include:

 Antonín Hrstka (1908–?), Czech rower
 Jakub Hrstka (born 1990), Czech handball player
 Lucie Hrstková-Pešánová (born 1981), Czech alpine skier

Czech-language surnames